Plane Daffy is a 1944 Warner Bros. Looney Tunes cartoon directed by Frank Tashlin. The cartoon was released on September 16, 1944, and stars Daffy Duck.

The cartoon is a World War II propaganda short that depicts Daffy as a messenger battling a female Nazi spy and eventually being confronted with Adolf Hitler, Joseph Goebbels and Hermann Göring. This is the first Looney Tunes short in which Leon Schlesinger did not participate.

Plot
One after another of a company of carrier pigeons fall prey to the seductive wiles of "Queen of the Spies": Hatta Mari. The alarm is raised at pigeon headquarters when Pigeon 13 (a Mortimer Snerd-esque yokel similar to Beaky Buzzard) goes AWOL with the female Nazi spy bird. He reveals all his secrets (after she slipped him a mickey). In shame, Pigeon 13 departs to commit suicide, although after an off-screen gunshot is heard, he briefly returns to note "I missed."

Later, self-described woman-hater Daffy Duck volunteers for the next mission. Hatta tries to seduce him by hiking up her skirt to reveal her shapely leg and kissing him full on the lips twice. The first kiss electrocutes Daffy and melts him like butter, but the second kiss electrocutes Hatta Mari having the same effect on her. Daffy ultimately resists her charms, but swallows his secret message when the temptress corners him. After a frenetic battle, she x-rays Daffy and broadcasts the supposed secret ("Hitler is a stinker") to Hitler himself. Outraged, Hitler declares "Dat ist no military secret!" Goebbels and Göring concur -- "Ja. Everybody knows dat!"—then shoot themselves in the heads after receiving Hitler's angry glare. Daffy Duck then concludes the cartoon by saying "They lose more darn ‘Nutzis’ that way," and then going into one of his famous bouncing fits whooping.

Reception
Animation historian Martin Goodman writes, "What sets this short apart is the burgeoning sense that Tashlin was beginning to incorporate cinematic structure and technique to his animated cartoons. The short opens with grim narration superimposed over a down shot of stoic military carrier pigeons poring over a map; the lighting effects are dramatic, and clouds of cigarette smoke rise steadily above the birds. Later in the film, Daffy opens a sequence of doors trying to escape Hatta Mari. She is behind everyone, holding an increasingly large weapon, and each time the perspective is different as Tashlin experiments with camera angles... The combination of imaginative approach, aggressive sexuality, and wartime élan make Plane Daffy one of Warner's best wartime efforts."

Notes
"Hatta Mari" is a parody of Mata Hari.
According to DVD commentary on the Looney Tunes Golden Collection: Volume 4, Hatta Mari’s blond hair and cartoonishly top-heavy body figure would later become a reality in the 1950s with actress and sex symbol Jayne Mansfield (who, in turn, was one of many inspirations for Roger Rabbit’s femme fatale Jessica Rabbit).
The quote "Something new has been added" was a catchphrase by Jerry Colonna and a slogan for Old Gold cigarettes.

This is the first Looney Tunes short in which Leon Schlesinger did not participate, because he sold the studio to Warner Bros, after Buckaroo Bugs.

Home media
VHS - Viddy-Oh! For Kids Cartoon Festivals: Daffy Duck Cartoon Festival Featuring "Daffy Duck and the Dinosaur"
VHS, LaserDisc - Cartoon Moviestars: Bugs and Daffy: The Wartime Cartoons
LaserDisc - The Golden Age of Looney Tunes: Vol. 2, Side 3: Frank Tashlin
DVD - Looney Tunes Golden Collection: Volume 4, Disc 2 (with optional audio commentary by Greg Ford)
DVD - The Essential Daffy Duck, Disc 1 
Blu-ray, DVD - Looney Tunes Platinum Collection: Volume 3, Disc 2 (with optional audio commentary by Greg Ford)

See also
List of World War II short films

References

External links

1944 films
American World War II propaganda shorts
Short films directed by Frank Tashlin
Looney Tunes shorts
1940s spy comedy films
Cultural depictions of Adolf Hitler
Animation based on real people
Cultural depictions of Mata Hari
Cultural depictions of Hermann Göring
Cultural depictions of Joseph Goebbels
1944 animated films
Daffy Duck films
1940s war comedy films
Films scored by Carl Stalling
1940s American animated films
1944 comedy films